Malta participated in the Eurovision Song Contest 2007 with the song "Vertigo" written by Philip Vella and Gerard James Borg. The song was performed by Olivia Lewis. The Maltese entry for the 2007 contest in Helsinki, Finland was selected through the national final Malta Song for Europe 2007, organised by the Maltese broadcaster Public Broadcasting Services (PBS). The competition consisted of a semi-final round and a final, held on 1 and 3 February 2007, respectively, where "Vertigo" performed by Olivia Lewis eventually emerged as the winning entry after gaining 56% of the public televote.

Malta competed in the semi-final of the Eurovision Song Contest which took place on 10 May 2007. Performing during the show in position 20, "Vertigo" was not announced among the 10 qualifying entries of the semi-final and therefore did not qualify to compete in the final on 12 May. This marked the first time that Malta failed to qualify to the final of the Eurovision Song Contest from a semi-final since the introduction of semi-finals in 2004. It was later revealed that Malta placed twenty-fifth out of the 28 participating countries in the semi-final with 15 points.

Background 

Prior to the 2007 Contest, Malta had participated in the Eurovision Song Contest nineteen times since its first entry in 1971. Malta briefly competed in the Eurovision Song Contest in the 1970s before withdrawing for sixteen years. The country had, to this point, competed in every contest since returning in 1991. Malta's best placing in the contest thus far was second, which it achieved on two occasions: in 2002 with the song "7th Wonder" performed by Ira Losco and in the 2005 contest with the song "Angel" performed by Chiara. In the 2006 edition, Malta automatically qualified to the final and placed 24th (last) with the song "I Do" performed by Fabrizio Faniello.

For the 2007 Contest, the Maltese national broadcaster, Public Broadcasting Services (PBS), broadcast the event within Malta and organised the selection process for the nation's entry. PBS confirmed their intentions to participate at it on 4 September 2006. Malta selected their entry consistently through a national final procedure, a method that was continued for their 2007 participation.

Before Eurovision

Malta Song for Europe 2007
Malta Song for Europe 2007 was the national final format developed by PBS to select the Maltese entry for the Eurovision Song Contest 2007. The competition consisted of a semi-final and final held on 1 and 3 February 2007, respectively, at the Malta Fairs & Conventions Centre in Ta' Qali. Both shows were hosted by Stephanie Spiteri and J. Anvil and broadcast on Television Malta (TVM) as well on the website di-ve.com.

Format 
The competition consisted of sixteen songs competing in the semi-final on 1 February 2007 where the top six entries qualified to compete in the final on 3 February 2007. Two of the songs in the semi-final were selected through the competition Opportunity 2, broadcast during the TVM programme Showtime between 4 November 2006 and 17 December 2006. Seven judges evaluated the songs during the semi-final and each judge had an equal stake in the result. The results of the public televote had a weighting equal to the total votes of the judges. In the final, the results were determined exclusively by public televoting. The seven members of the jury that evaluated the entries during the semi-final consisted of:

 Helle Henning (Denmark) – Singer-songwriter
 Trine Dansgaard (Denmark) – Singer and music teacher
 John Themis (United Kingdom) – Producer and composer
 Jan van Dijck (Netherlands) – Director of EMI publishing and composer
 Lia Vissi (Cyprus) – Singer-songwriter
 Savvas Savva (Cyprus) – Pianist and composer
 Victor Escudero (Spain) – Radio DJ

Competing entries 
Artists and composers were able to submit their entries for Malta Song for Europe 2007 between 4 September 2006 and 30 October 2006.Songwriters from any nationality were able to submit songs as long as entry applications from foreign songwriters were eligible in their country. Artists were required to be Maltese or possess Maltese citizenship and could submit as many songs as they wished, however, they could only compete with a maximum of one in the semi-final. 228 entries were received by the broadcaster. For Opportunity 2, only artists that have never competed in Malta Song for Europe were able to submit their entries between 7 September 2006 and 13 October 2006. On 26 November 2006, PBS announced a shortlist of 35 entries that had progressed through the selection process of Malta Song for Europe 2008. The fifteen songs selected to compete in Opportunity 2 were announced on 24 October 2006, while fourteen of the songs selected to compete in the semi-final of Malta Song for Europe 2007 were announced on 9 December 2006.

Among the selected competing artists was former Maltese Eurovision entrant William Mangion who represented Malta in the 1993 contest. Among the songwriters, Aldo Spiteri, Jason Paul Cassar, Paul Abela, Sunny Aquilina, Gerard James Borg and Philip Vella were all past writers of Maltese Eurovision entries. Paul Giordimaina represented Malta in the 1991 edition.

Opportunity 2 
Opportunity 2 took place over six shows between 4 November 2006 and 17 December 2006. Fifteen songs competed for five qualifying spots in the final show, during which the two remaining spots in Malta Song for Europe 2007 were announced.

Semi-final 
The semi-final took place on 1 February 2007. Sixteen songs competed for six qualifying spots in the final. The running order for the semi-final was announced on 11 January 2007. The interval act featured guest performances by 2006 Romanian Eurovision entrant Mihai Trăistariu, the Yada Dance Company and the local band Winter Moods.

Final 
The final took place on 3 February 2007. The six entries that qualified from the semi-final were performed again and the winner was determined solely by a public televote. The show was opened with a guest performance of "I Do" by 2006 Maltese Eurovision entrant Fabrizio Faniello and the Yada Dance Company, while the interval act featured performances by the Ukrainian Eurovision 2004 winner Ruslana. After the results of the public televote were announced, "Vertigo" performed by Olivia Lewis was the winner.

Preparation 
Following Lewis's win at the Malta Song for Europe 2007, PBS announced that "Vertigo" would undergo remastering for the Eurovision Song Contest. The revamped version was produced by Swedish production company G Songs in Stockholm. The release of the song's new version and official music video was announced on 9 March 2007 during the TVM talk show programme Xarabank. The music video for the song was filmed earlier in March at several places of Malta, including the St. Paul's Band Club in Rabat and at an old cemetery in Mdina.

Promotion 
Olivia Lewis made several appearances across Europe to specifically promote "Vertigo" as the Maltese Eurovision entry. On 17 February, Olivia Lewis performed during the sixth show of the Spanish Eurovision national final, Misión Eurovisión 2007. On 23 February, she performed during the presentation show of the 2007 Cypriot Eurovision entry, Cyprus 12 Points, Chypre 12 Points. On 3 and 9 March, Lewis performed during the final of the Lithuanian and the Ukrainian Eurovision national finals, respectively. Olivia Lewis also completed promotional activities in Belarus following her performances in Spain, Cyprus and Ukraine. Between 13 and 15 April, Lewis performed during the Songfestivalparty event which was held in Belgium at the D-Club and Popi Café venue in Antwerp and at the Le You venue in Brussels, as well as appearing during the RTL 4 programme Life & Cooking in The Netherlands.

At Eurovision
The Eurovision Song Contest 2007 took place at the Hartwall Areena in Helsinki, Finland and consisted of a semi-final on 10 May and the final of 12 May 2007. According to Eurovision rules, all nations with the exceptions of the host country and the "Big Four" (France, Germany, Spain and the United Kingdom) are required to qualify from the semi-final in order to compete for the final; the top ten countries from the semi-final progress to the final. On 12 March 2007, a special allocation draw was held which determined the running order for the semi-final and Malta was set to perform in position 20, following the entry from Norway and before the entry from Andorra.

The semi-final and the final were broadcast in Malta on TVM with commentary by Antonia Micallef. The Maltese spokesperson, who announced the Maltese votes during the final, was Mireille Bonello.

Semi-final 

Olivia Lewis took part in technical rehearsals on 4 and 6 May, followed by dress rehearsals on 9 and 10 May. The Maltese performance featured Olivia Lewis wearing a yellow and blue Asian-styled dress and performing together with two dancers performing the violin and a golden gong, respectively, and three backing vocalists performing a fan routine behind Lewis and the dancers. The background LED screens projected white and red molten ultraviolet arcs of light spinning on an electric blue background. The performance also featured the use of wind machines. The creative director for the Maltese performance was Anna Christodoulidou. The backing vocalists that joined Olivia Lewis on stage were Jaana Vähämäki, Johanna Beijbom and Lisette Vega, while the dancers were Jes Sciberras and Joseph Chetcuti.

At the end of the show, Malta was not announced among the top 10 entries in the semi-final and therefore failed to qualify to compete in the final. This marked the first time that Malta failed to qualify to the final of the Eurovision Song Contest from the semi-final since the introduction of semi-finals in 2004. It was later revealed that Malta placed twenty-fifth in the semi-final, receiving a total of 15 points.

Voting 
Below is a breakdown of points awarded to Malta and awarded by Malta in the semi-final and grand final of the contest. The nation awarded its 12 points to Latvia in the semi-final and to United Kingdom in the final of the contest.

Points awarded to Malta

Points awarded by Malta

References

2007
Countries in the Eurovision Song Contest 2007
Eurovision